The Changhe Q25 is a Subcompact crossover produced by Changhe. It was the second car released under BAIC ownership, after the Freedom/Furuida M50.

Overview

The Changhe Q25 was built on the same platforms with the Senova X25.

Unveiled during the 2015 Guangzhou Auto Show, the pricing of the Q25 starts at 55,900 yuan (US$8,153) and ends at 76,900 yuan (US$11,197), positioning slightly upmarket compared to the Senova X25.

References

External links 

Crossover sport utility vehicles
Changhe vehicles
Cars introduced in 2015
Cars of China